The 2002 Sumatra earthquake occurred at 01:26 UTC on 2 November. It had a magnitude of 7.4 on the moment magnitude scale with an epicenter just north of Simeulue island and caused three deaths. This earthquake is regarded as a foreshock of the 2004 Indian Ocean earthquake, which had an epicenter about 60 km to the northwest.

Tectonic setting

The island of Sumatra lies on the convergent plate boundary between the Indo-Australian Plate and the Eurasian Plate. The convergence between these plates is highly oblique near Sumatra, with the displacement being accommodated by near pure dip-slip faulting along the subduction zone, known as the Sunda megathrust, and near pure strike-slip faulting along the Great Sumatran fault. The major slip events on the subduction zone interface are typically of megathrust type. Historically, great or giant megathrust earthquakes have been recorded in 1797, 1833, 1861, 2004, 2005 and 2007, most of them being associated with devastating tsunamis. Smaller (but still large) megathrust events have also occurred in the small gaps between the areas that slip during the larger events, in 1935, 1984, 2000 and 2002.

Damage
The greatest effects were felt on the island of Simeulue, where 994 buildings were damaged, three people died and 65 were injured. The earthquake was also felt at Tapaktuan (VI (Strong)), Meulaboh and Singkil (V (Moderate)) in the Aceh province of Sumatra.

Characteristics
The rupture area of the 2002 earthquake lies at the boundary between the rupture areas of the 2004 and 2005 earthquakes, as determined by the uplift patterns of coral microatolls. From its proximity to the epicenter of the 2004 earthquake, it is regarded as a foreshock of that event. Microatolls around Simeulue show evidence of uplift as a result of the 2002 event, distinct from the uplift caused by the 2004 event. Waveforms from this earthquake have been used to model the propagation of Rayleigh waves during the 2004 earthquake, using an empirical Green's function analysis.

See also
List of earthquakes in 2002
List of earthquakes in Indonesia

References

External links

2002 disasters in Indonesia
Earthquakes in Sumatra
Earthquakes in Indonesia
Sumatra Earthquake, 2002
November 2002 events in Asia
2002 in Indonesia
History of Sumatra